The Sibiti River is a seventy-five-kilometre waterway  which connects Lake Eyasi and Lake Kitangiri, and one of the few non-man-made canals in the world. The river is a natural border between Singida Region and Simiyu Region In northcentral Tanzania.

The Sibiti River has one tributary, The Semu River. The Sibiti River belongs to a rather dense Basin which includes Lake Eyasi, and several rivers entering Lake Kitangiri, including:

 Manonga River
 Wembere River
 Cheli River
 Mpiringa River
 Mwaru River
 Mhawala River
 Nyahua River
 Chona River
 Kapatu River

Sibiti River in History
 A Bantu-speaking people, The Nyiramba, crossed the Sibiti River while looking for pacific lands. Some of their anecdotes highlight the marshy nature of the area around the Sibiti River.
 Some archaeological remains have been found near lake Eyasi by a German Expedition in the 1930s.

References 
 National Geographic. African Adventure Atlas. Pg 28-31

Rivers of Tanzania